Siboniso Gumede (born 14 September 1985) is a South African former football player who played as a defender for AmaZulu, Bidvest Wits, Black Aces, and Platinum Stars. He was active from 2008 to 2017 in the Premier Soccer League.

References
 

1985 births
Living people
People from Empangeni
Zulu people
South African soccer players
Association football defenders
AmaZulu F.C. players
Bidvest Wits F.C. players